Shadine van der Merwe (born 25 November 1992) is a South African netball player. She was part of the South African squad that finished in fifth place at the 2018 Commonwealth Games. van der Merwe was signed by the Surrey Storm in the UK Superleague in 2018, and was also selected in South Africa's national senior team for the 2018 Commonwealth Games and the 2019 Netball World Cup. In May 2019 she was signed by the Adelaide Thunderbirds in the Australian Super Netball league, having been selected by the team as a replacement player for the long-term injured Beth Cobden.
She is now signed to the Manchester Thunder for the 2022- 2023 season.

External links
 Varsity Sports SA Profile
 Surrey Storm Profile

References

1992 births
Living people
South African netball players
Place of birth missing (living people)
Adelaide Thunderbirds players
Netball players at the 2018 Commonwealth Games
Commonwealth Games competitors for South Africa
2019 Netball World Cup players
South African expatriate netball people in Australia
South African expatriate netball people in England
Surrey Storm players
Netball Superleague players
Sportspeople from Pretoria